The 2019–20 South Carolina Gamecocks women's basketball team represents the University of South Carolina during the 2019–20 NCAA Division I women's basketball season. The Gamecocks, led by twelfth-year head coach Dawn Staley, play their home games at the Colonial Life Arena and are members of the Southeastern Conference.

Previous season
The Gamecocks finished the 2018–19 season 23–10, 13–3 in SEC play to finish in second place. They lost in the quarterfinals of the SEC women's tournament to Arkansas. They received an at-large bid to the NCAA women's tournament where they defeated Belmont and Florida State in the first and second rounds before losing to Baylor in the Sweet Sixteen.

Offseason

Departures

Incoming transfers

Recruits
The Gamecocks signed the #1 class in the nation for 2019 according to ESPN and Prospects nation.

Roster

Schedule

|-
!colspan=12 style=| Exhibition

|-
!colspan=12 style=| Regular season

|-
!colspan=9 style=| SEC Tournament

Due to the COVID-19 pandemic, the NCAA ended all play on March 12, 2020.

Rankings

^Coaches did not release a Week 2 poll

On December 31, 2020, during the 2020-21 home opener against Florida, the Gamecocks raised a championship banner recognising the mythical national championship claim by polls.

References

South Carolina Gamecocks women's basketball seasons
South Carolina
Gamecocks
Gamecocks